Slavko Dokmanović (Serbian Cyrillic: Славко Докмановић; 14 December 1949 – 29 June 1998) was a Croatian Serb who was charged with grave breaches of the Geneva Conventions, violation of the customs of war and crimes against humanity by the International Criminal Tribunal for the Former Yugoslavia (ICTY) for his actions in the Vukovar massacre while he served as the city's mayor.

Dokmanović faced two charges of each count. He was arrested in 1997 by the Polish special forces GROM and pleaded not guilty to all charges. However, he died on 29 June 1998, having hanged himself in his cell, and his trial's proceedings soon stopped without a verdict. He was indicted along with Mile Mrkšić, Veselin Šljivančanin and Miroslav Radić, who were all on trial for their alleged role in the massacre.

See also 
 Battle of Vukovar
 Croatian War of Independence

References

External links 
 	Dokmanović (IT-95-13a) "Vukovar Hospital", ICTY
 ICTY Case Information Sheet
 ICTY Amended Indictment
 The Death of S. Dokmanovic ICTY Bulletin N°21
 Slavko Dokmanovic's Death Institute for War & Peace Reporting

1949 births
1998 suicides
Serbs of Croatia
Politicians of the Croatian War of Independence
People indicted by the International Criminal Tribunal for the former Yugoslavia
People who committed suicide in prison custody
Serbian politicians who committed suicide
Republic of Serbian Krajina
Mayors of Vukovar
League of Communists of Croatia politicians
Social Democratic Party of Croatia politicians
Serbian people who died in prison custody
Suicides by hanging in the Netherlands